Andrey Tveryankin (born 6 March 1967), is an Azerbaijani futsal player who plays for KPRF Moskva and the Azerbaijan national futsal team.

References

External links
UEFA profile

1967 births
Living people
Futsal goalkeepers
Azerbaijani men's futsal players
Araz Naxçivan players